Colomastigidae is a family of amphipods belonging to the order Amphipoda.

Genera:
 Colomastix Grube, 1861
 Yulumara Barnard, 1972

References

Amphipoda